Saint-Lambert was a federal electoral district in the Canadian province of Quebec. It was first represented in the House of Commons of Canada in 1997. Its population in 2006 was 94,541. It has been replaced by Brossard—Saint-Lambert.

Geography
This riding on Montreal's South Shore was located in the Quebec region of Montérégie. The district included the City of Saint-Lambert, the former City of Greenfield Park, the former Town of LeMoyne, and the western part of the pre-2002 City of Longueuil.

The neighbouring ridings were Longueuil—Pierre-Boucher, Saint-Bruno—Saint-Hubert, Brossard—La Prairie, Jeanne-Le Ber, Laurier—Sainte-Marie, and Hochelaga.

Demographics
According to the Canada 2001 Census

 Ethnic groups: 90.4% White, 3.0% Black, 1.2% Arab, 1.1% Chinese
 Languages: 77.0% French, 11.9% English, 9.2% Others, 1.9% Multiple responses
 Religions: 77.9% Catholic, 8.1% Protestant, 2.5% Muslim, 1.2% Christian Orthodox, 7.9% No religion
 Average income: $29,974

Members of Parliament

This riding elected the following Members of Parliament:

Election results

	
Note: Conservative vote is compared to the total of the Canadian Alliance vote and Progressive Conservative vote in 2000 election.

See also
 List of Canadian federal electoral districts
 Past Canadian electoral districts

References

Campaign expense data from Elections Canada
Riding history from the Library of Parliament
2011 results from Elections Canada

Notes

Former federal electoral districts of Quebec
Politics of Longueuil
Saint-Lambert, Quebec